The canton of Roura (French: Canton de Roura) is one of the former cantons of the Guyane department in French Guiana. It was located in the arrondissement of Cayenne. Its administrative seat was located in Roura, the canton's sole commune. Its population was 3,050 in 2012.

Administration

References

Roura